The 2012 Haarlem Baseball Week was an international baseball competition held at the Pim Mulier Stadium in Haarlem, the Netherlands from July 13–22, 2012. It was the 26th edition of the tournament.

In the final Cuba won over Puerto Rico, becoming champions for the fifth time.

Teams
The following teams competed in the tournament.

 
 Chinese Taipei is the official IBAF designation for the team representing the state officially referred to as the Republic of China, more commonly known as Taiwan. (See also political status of Taiwan for details.)

Group stage

Standings

Game results

Final round

Semi finals

Bronze medal game

Final

Final standings

Tournament awards

External links
Official Website

References

Haarlem Baseball Week